Joy Thomas is an Indian politician and currently the President of the Kerala State Co-operative Consumers Federation Limited.

Early life
Joy Thomas was born in  Idukki, Idukki district of Kerala in a Syrian Catholic Christian family. In his entire political career Joy completed his Bachelor of Arts degree from New Man College, Thodupuzha and Bachelor of Law from Law Academy Law College, Thiruvananthapuram.

Political career
Joy Thomas started his political career at the age of 14. He worked for the Kerala Students Union in his native town. He was noted by the teachers and the students for his sincere attitude towards the fight for equality. He used to easily win his classroom representative elections by a huge margin. He continued to work for Kerala Students Union while studying in Kerala Law Academy Law College at Thiruvananthapuram. He was appointed as the State Vice President of the Kerala Students Union while Ramesh Chennithala was appointed as the State President. He returned to his native Idukki after his education and was appointed as the Idukki District President of the Indian Youth Congress. He was then given the post as the Idukki District General Secretary of District Congress Committee, a post he held until 2001. After the 2001 Kerala Assembly Elections, he was appointed as the President of Idukki District Congress Committee. During the same period, he was able to wrestle the control of the Idukki District Co-operative Bank from the Left Democratic Front and was appointed as its President for a five-year term. He held the post until the end of 2006 Kerala Assembly Elections. He was then appointed as the Idukki District UDF Chairman under the leadership of the State UDF Chairman P.P. Thankachan, who was the acting President of Kerala Pradesh Congress Committee in 2004.

References

External links
http://www.dccidukki.org.in/ 

Living people
Syro-Malabar Catholics
Malayali politicians
Indian National Congress politicians from Kerala
People from Idukki district
Year of birth missing (living people)